The 2018 World Wheelchair-B Curling Championship, was held from November 9 to 15, 2018 at the Kisakallio Sports Institute in Lohja, Finland. The qualification event is open to any World Curling Federation member nation not already qualified for the 2019 World Wheelchair Curling Championship. The event's three medalists, Estonia, Slovakia, and Latvia, join the host and the top eight finishers from the last World Wheelchair Curling Championship at this season's event in Stirling, Scotland.

Round robin standings

Playoffs

References

External links

World Wheelchair Curling Championship
World Wheelchair-B
World Wheelchair-B Curling
International curling competitions hosted by Finland
Lohja